Scratchwood and Moat Mount Local Nature Reserve may refer to:
                                             
Moat Mount Open Space
Scratchwood